Piersol is a surname. Notable people with the surname include:

John Piersol McCaskey (1837–1934), American educator and politician
Lawrence L. Piersol (born 1940), American judge

See also
Pierson (surname)